Scott Stephen Nicolas (born August 7, 1960) is a former American football linebacker in the National Football League (NFL).

Nicolas played high school football for the Clearwater Tornadoes in Clearwater, Florida, and college football for the University of Miami Hurricanes and then spent six seasons as a linebacker with the NFL's Cleveland Browns (1982–1986) and the Miami Dolphins (1987).

High school
Scott Nicolas was a 3 sport letterman in football, baseball, and basketball. earned Clearwater high's two most prestigious athletic awards, the Earle Brown Award, and the Best All Around Senior Athlete Award. His senior yr he was first-team All-County Honors, All-District, All-Regions, All Suncoast, All-State, and honorable mention All-American.

College
Nicolas attended the University of Miami and played for the Miami Hurricanes football team from 1978 to 1981. He became a starter his freshman year against Notre Dame. As a freshman, he set and still holds the record for the most tackles in a single game, 26, against Penn State. He went on to lead the team in tackles that season and every season after. When Nicolas left the University of Miami, he held the all-time record for total tackles, with 307 unassisted tackles and 149 assists. He set the record for the most solo tackles and most tackles in a single season.
Nicolas was inducted into the University of Miami Sports Hall of Fame at the 51st Annual Induction Banquet in 2019

Professional career
Cleveland Browns
Scott was drafted by the Cleveland Browns in 1982 and played for them for 5yrs.

Miami Dolphins
Nicolas was signed by the Miami Dolphins in 1987. In the 1988 season, he tore his rotator cuff, he was placed on injured reserve for the remainder of the season.  The Dolphins eventually released him in May, 1989, when he could not pass his physical due to his shoulder injury .

References

External links
 https://web.archive.org/web/20100218103328/http://databasefootball.com/players/playerpage.htm?ilkid=NICOLSCO01

American football linebackers
Cleveland Browns players
Miami Hurricanes football players
Miami Dolphins players
People from Wichita Falls, Texas
Clearwater High School alumni
Sportspeople from Clearwater, Florida
Players of American football from Florida
1960 births
Living people